William Howard (born October 25, 1993) is a French professional basketball player who last played for Joventut Badalona of the Spanish Liga ACB. Howard started his basketball career in his home country, France.

Professional career

Gravelines-Dunkerque (2012–2014)
In June 2012, while preparing to enter the University of Washington, he returned to France because he was ineligible for the NCAA because of a low score on an English exam. A month later, he signed with BCM Gravelines-Dunkerque.

On June 25, 2014, he was extended for two years by Gravelines-Dunkerque.

Loan to Denain Voltaire (2014–2015)
On July 12, 2014, he was sent on loan to Denain Voltaire Basket in Pro B.

Hyères-Toulon (2015–2017)
Between June 20 and June 25, 2015, he participated in an internship in Vichy with the France A team.

On June 25, 2015, he joined Hyères-Toulon.

Limoges CSP (2017–2019)
On May 27, 2017, Howard joined Limoges CSP. On June 15, 2018, the Limoges re-signed with Howard for another year.

Salt Lake City Stars (2019)
On July 15, 2019, he received an offer to join the Utah Jazz, who helped buy out his contract with Limoges. Howard officially signed with the Jazz on July 17. He was ultimately waived and added to their NBA G League affiliate, the Salt Lake City Stars.

Houston Rockets (2019–2020)
On December 27, 2019, the Houston Rockets announced via Twitter that they had signed Howard to a two-way contract.

ASVEL (2020–2022)
On July 16, 2020, ASVEL announced that they had signed with Howard.

Joventut Badalona (2022)
On July 21, 2022, he has signed with Joventut Badalona of the Spanish Liga ACB.

Career statistics

NBA

|-
| style="text-align:left;"| 
| style="text-align:left;"| Houston
| 2 || 0 || 6.5 || .000 || .000 || — || 1.0 || .5 || .0 || .0 || .0
|- class="sortbottom"
| style="text-align:center;" colspan="2"| Career
| 2 || 0 || 6.5 || .000 || .000 || — || 1.0 || .5 || .0 || .0 || .0

References

External links

 Profile at eurobasket.com
 Profile at draftexpress.com

1993 births
Living people
ASVEL Basket players
BCM Gravelines players
Denain Voltaire Basket players
French expatriate basketball people in the United States
French men's basketball players
Houston Rockets players
HTV Basket players
Joventut Badalona players
Liga ACB players
Limoges CSP players
National Basketball Association players from France
People from Montbrison, Loire
Power forwards (basketball)
Rio Grande Valley Vipers players
Salt Lake City Stars players
Small forwards
Sportspeople from Loire (department)
Undrafted National Basketball Association players